Hella Moja (born Helene Gertrud Schwerdtfeger, 18 January 1896 – December 1951) was a German screenwriter, film producer and film actress. She was married to the director Heinz Paul.

Biography
Hella Moja was born Helene Gertrud Schwerdtfeger  on 18 January 1896. Some sources list her birthdate as 2 February 1890.

Early in her career, Moja appeared at the Teatr Artystyczny in Warsaw. After both of her parents died, she worked as a translator for Polish and Russian, and as a writer for the Deutsche Presse-Korrespondenz in Hannover, the Ullstein-Verlag, and the Scherl-Verlag.

Moja began taking acting lessons with Emmanuel Reicher and Frida Richard and made her debut in 1913 at the Lessing Theater in Berlin. Alwin Neuß took notice of Moja, and she made her film debut in The White Rose (1915). Some of her early film appearances include The Path of Tears (1916), The Oath of Renate Rabenau (1917), The Stranger (1917), and The Enchanted Castle (1918). In 1918, Moja founded her own film company, Hella Moja Filmgesellschaft, which would produce 16 films. Her first production was Wondrous is the Fairy Tale of Love (1918) with Ernst Hofmann, for which critics praised her acting.

In the 1920s, Moja starred in films such as Countess Walewska (1920), directed by Otto Rippert, What a Girl (1920), Felicitas Grolandin (1923), Department Store Princess (1926), U-9 Weddigen (1927), and The Carousel of Death (1928).

In addition to acting and producing, she is credited with writing 13 films, including Department Store Princess (1926), The False Prince (1927), Three Days of Life and Death (1929), The Other Side (1931), and the Nazi propaganda film The Four Musketeers (1934), all of which her husband Heinz Paul directed.

Moja only appeared in seven films in the 1930s, making her final screen appearance in Comrades at Sea (1938). In 1938, she was expelled from the Reichsfilmkammer on the grounds that she was only a part-time screenwriter.

Moja legally changed her name to Helka Moroff in 1934, to Elka Moroff in 1937, and to Hella Sewa in 1942. She worked as a prompter at Theater Kiel from 1942 until her death in 1951.

Moja committed suicide in December 1951, although a newspaper reported her death in 1937, and some sources list her death date as 15 January 1937. She was buried at Friedhof Heerstraße, but her tomb was later leveled.

Selected filmography
 The Dancer from Tanagra (1920)
 Countess Walewska (1920)
 What a Girl (1920)
 Black Monday (1922)
 The Beautiful Girl (1923)
 Fiat Lux (1923)
 Felicitas Grolandin (1923)
 The Man at Midnight (1924)
 The Dice Game of Life (1925)
 Department Store Princess (1926)
 The False Prince (1927)
 U-9 Weddigen (1927)
 The Carousel of Death (1928)
 Marriage in Name Only (1930)
 The Love Market (1930)
 The Other Side (1931)
 Student Life in Merry Springtime (1931)
 Marshal Forwards (1932)
 The Four Musketeers (1934)
 Comrades at Sea (1938)

References

Bibliography

External links

1896 births
German women screenwriters
German film producers
German film actresses
German silent film actresses
20th-century German actresses
Mass media people from Königsberg
20th-century German screenwriters
1951 suicides
Suicides in Germany